"Ten Year Series (TYS)" is a term used by Singaporeans, in particular students, to refer to official compilation books of examination papers in past years for the General Certificate of Education (GCE) Normal Level (N-level), Ordinary Level (O-level) and Advanced Level (A-level), approved by the Singapore Examinations and Assessment Board (SEAB) and University of Cambridge Local Examinations Syndicate (UCLES). 

In Singapore schools, these books are known to be used extensively by teachers and students in preparation for similar questions that may be asked in upcoming examinations. Most students review these past examination papers in order to seek to reveal applications of concepts as well as encounter the forms of various new concepts which would be covered in examinations but not explicitly in the syllabus.

Critics of the education system claim this phenomenon to be signs of rote learning, that goes against the emphasis for creative thinking by the government. 

Until 2007, the term is not always truly literal since some of these books have compilations containing papers from more than two decades worth of examinations, which means that students will thus often be doing practice papers that are set even before they were born. SEAB has since implemented a new rule limited the publication of papers to the past ten years, which resulting in a spike of demand for older ten-year series. Ten-year series should not be confused with assessment books (books containing questions on specific subjects for students to practise), which serve as an additional practice, or as a form of enrichment. The latter are privately authored and sold in bookstores.

See also
 Education in Singapore

References

Ten Year Series (TYS)
Academic pressure in East Asian culture
Learning methods